Dough for the Do-Do is a 1949 Warner Bros. Merrie Melodies cartoon directed by Friz Freleng. The short was released on September 2, 1949, and stars Porky Pig. The short is a remake of Bob Clampett's 1938 cartoon Porky in Wackyland, as well as using footage from his 1943 cartoon Tin Pan Alley Cats.

Plot 
The cartoon begins with a newspaper showing Porky traveling to Africa to hunt the rare dodo bird. Porky flies his airplane to go to Dark Africa, then Darker Africa, and finally lands in Darkest Africa. When Porky lands, a sign tells him that he's in Wackyland ("Population: 100 nuts and a squirrel"), while a scary voice booms out "It can happen here!" Porky enters into a surreal Dali-esque landscape and encounters many strange, weird, and oafish creatures.
 
Suddenly, the last dodo of the dodo species appears. Porky tries to catch the dodo, but the dodo plays tricks on him. At one time, the dodo appears on the Warner Bros. shield and sling shots Porky into the ground. Finally, Porky dresses as another dodo and announces that he is the last dodo, worth six trillion dollars. The dodo handcuffs himself to Porky, claiming "I've got the last Dodo!" and runs with Porky to claim the reward. Porky reveals himself, and still handcuffed to the dodo, runs off with him, now proclaiming: "Oh, no, you haven't! I-I'm rich! I-I've got the last D-D-Dodo!" Once they disappear over the horizon, several more dodos appear and say that Porky does indeed have the last dodo.

Home media 
 VHS - The Looney Tunes Video Show, Volume 6
 VHS - Porky Pig's Screwball Comedies (time-compressed)
 Laserdisc - Longitude and Looneytude: Globetrotting Looney Tunes Favorites
 VHS - Looney Tunes Presents: Taz's Jungle Jams (1998 "THIS VERSION", without notice)
 DVD - Looney Tunes Golden Collection: Volume 1, Disc 2

References

External links 
 

1949 films
1949 animated films
1949 short films
Merrie Melodies short films
Warner Bros. Cartoons animated short films
Short films directed by Friz Freleng
Porky Pig films
Remakes of American films
Films set in Africa
Films scored by Carl Stalling
Surrealist films
1940s Warner Bros. animated short films
Dodo
1950s English-language films
1950s American films
Animated film remakes